The 2019 UK Championship (also known as the 2019 Betway UK Championship for sponsorship reasons) was a professional snooker tournament that took place from 26 November to 8 December 2019 in the Barbican Centre, York, England. The 43rd edition of the UK Championship, it was the seventh ranking tournament and the first Triple Crown event of the 2019–20 season. The event was broadcast on BBC Sport in the United Kingdom and on Eurosport throughout Europe. The tournament was sponsored by betting company Betway.

The defending champion, Ronnie O'Sullivan, had won the previous two championships, defeating Shaun Murphy 10–5 in the 2017 final, and Mark Allen 10–6 in the 2018 final. O'Sullivan was eliminated in the last 16 by Ding Junhui, who won the match 6–4 and proceeded to reach the final of the event, defeating compatriots Liang Wenbo and Yan Bingtao, both 6–2, in the two intervening rounds. Ding's opponent in the final was Stephen Maguire, who had won his semi-final 6–0 against Mark Allen. Ding defeated Maguire 10–6 to win his third UK championship.	
	
Barry Hawkins compiled a maximum break in the fourth frame of his first round match with Gerard Greene. It was the first maximum break to be made at the UK Championship since 2016, and the third of Hawkins' career. There were a total of 139 century breaks in the event.

Overview

The 2019 UK Championship took place between 26 November and 8 December 2019 at the York Barbican, York, England. It was the 11th ranking event of the 2019–20 snooker season, and the first Triple Crown event of the season. All 128 players from the World Snooker Tour participated. Every match, except for the final, was played over a maximum of 11 , and the final was held over two sessions as a best-of-19-frames match. The first round of the competition started on 26 November, with players seeded according to their world rankings.

The defending champion, Ronnie O'Sullivan, had won the previous two UK championships, having defeated Shaun Murphy 10–5 in the 2017 final, and Mark Allen 10–6 in the 2018 final. O'Sullivan was seeded first, as defending champion, ahead of world number one Judd Trump. The tournament was broadcast live in the United Kingdom by BBC Sport, and shown on Eurosport in Europe. Worldwide, the event was covered by China Central Television and Superstars Online in China, and by Sky Sports in New Zealand. It was simulcast in Hong Kong by Now TV with additional commentary; DAZN covered the event across Canada, Brazil and the United States.

Prize fund
The total prize fund for the event was more than £1,000,000 for the first time, the winner receiving £200,000. The breakdown of prize money is shown below:

 Winner: £200,000
 Runner-up: £80,000
 Semi-final: £40,000
 Quarter-final: £24,500
 Last 16: £17,000
 Last 32: £12,000
 Last 64: £6,500
 Highest break: £15,000
 Total: £1,009,000

Summary

The 2019 UK Championship began with the opening round from 26 November. World number eight Shaun Murphy lost to Israeli player Eden Sharav 4–6. Murphy had led the match 3–1, before Sharav won five of the next six  to win the match. World number 118 James Cahill defeated world number 11 David Gilbert 6–4. Gilbert commented after the match that there were "no positives" from the match, and he wanted to "smash up [his] cue". Barry Hawkins compiled the highest  of the tournament, when he made a maximum break in the fourth frame of his 6–2 win over Gerard Greene. Kyren Wilson completed a 6–0 whitewash win over Riley Parsons, whilst Mark Williams defeated Fraser Patrick 6–2, despite calling his own performance "awful".

Two-time winner Mark Williams was defeated in the second round by Michael White. World number nine Kyren Wilson was defeated by world number 56 Marco Fu in a  5–6. In the third round, world number one Judd Trump was defeated by 54-year-old Nigel Bond 3–6. Bond trailed 1–3 early in the match, but won five straight frames to win the match. Trump had been attempting to hold all three Triple Crown events simultaneously, having won the Masters tournament and the World Championship earlier in the year. Ranked 98th in the world, Bond also progressed to the quarter-finals after defeating Gary Wilson 6–5, having trailed 2–5. Defending champion Ronnie O'Sullivan met Ding Junhui in the last 16, but failed to  a ball in the first three frames. However, O'Sullivan made back-to-back century breaks to tie the match at 4–4, before Ding took the final two frames to win 6–4.

Having last reached the quarter-finals 16 years previously, Nigel Bond met Mark Allen. Bond led 3–1, but Allen won the next three frames, before Bond tied the match twice to force a deciding frame. Allen won the decider, but commented that the match table was "probably the worst I have played on as a professional". Stephen Maguire, who was still recovering from a fractured foot from October, defeated Matthew Stevens 6–4. Teenager Yan Bingtao defeated three-time champion John Higgins 6–3 despite not making a break over 50. Ding Junhui defeated fellow Chinese player Liang Wenbo in the last quarter-final 6–2. In the semi-finals, Ding defeated Yan Bingtao 6–2, with Yan only making one break over 50. In the other semi-final, Maguire completed a 6–0 whitewash win over Allen in just 89 minutes. Post match, Allen commented that he was "a bit shell-shocked" by the result and that Maguire "played superbly from start to finish. He went for his shots, was aggressive and looked like he wanted it. If he plays like that, he will definitely beat Ding."

The final was played as the best of 19 frames on 8 December. Stephen Maguire had won the event previously in 2004 and had again reached the final in 2007, but had not won a ranking event since the 2013 Welsh Open. His opponent Ding Junhui had won the event in both 2005 and 2009, but had also not won a ranking event in the prior two years. Ding won the first four frames of the match, including two century breaks, before Maguire won the next three. Ding won the eighth frame to lead 5–3 at the end of the session, before winning the next two frames to lead 7–3. Maguire took frame 11 after a  but Ding won the next with a break of 67. However, Ding made a century break of his own in frame 15 to lead 9–6 and won the match in frame 16 with his fourth century of the final. This was Ding's third UK Championship title, his first in ten years.

Tournament draw
The results of the event are shown below. The winners of each match are indicated in bold.

Top half

Section 1

Section 2

Section 3

Section 4

Bottom half

Section 5

Section 6

Section 7

Section 8

Finals

Final

Century breaks
A total of 139 century breaks were made by 58 players during the championship. Barry Hawkins made the highest of the tournament, making a maximum break in his first round win over Gerard Greene. It was the first maximum break to be made at the UK Championship since 2016, and the third of Hawkins' career.

 147  Barry Hawkins
 141, 129, 126  Mark Allen
 140  Lu Ning
 139, 100, 100  Ali Carter
 138  Hossein Vafaei
 137, 136, 131, 131, 119, 110  Li Hang
 136  Alexander Ursenbacher
 135, 129, 124, 123, 116, 115, 108, 106, 103, 103, 100  Stephen Maguire
 135, 127, 121, 111, 106  Yan Bingtao
 135, 107  Matthew Stevens
 134, 130  Daniel Wells
 134, 129, 114  Mark Selby
 134, 124, 121, 114, 103, 103, 100  Gary Wilson
 133, 124, 107, 106  Ronnie O'Sullivan
 133, 124, 102  Mark Williams
 133, 106, 105, 100  Mark Davis
 131, 128, 116, 110, 105, 104, 103, 103, 101, 100  Ding Junhui
 131, 104  Anthony Hamilton
 130, 102  Martin O'Donnell
 130  James Cahill
 129, 111, 101  Michael Holt
 128, 114  Zhao Xintong
 128, 113  Kurt Maflin
 127, 122, 106, 105, 100  Stuart Bingham
 127, 100  Mei Xiwen
 127  Ryan Day
 125, 114, 105  Judd Trump
 124, 123, 103  John Higgins
 124  Luca Brecel
 124  Tom Ford
 123  Si Jiahui
 120, 115, 104  Ricky Walden
 119  Liam Highfield
 118, 103  Kacper Filipiak
 117, 110, 104  Marco Fu
 117  Xu Si
 115, 113, 104  Michael White
 115  David Grace
 114, 113  Nigel Bond
 112, 107  Alan McManus
 107, 105, 101  Neil Robertson
 107, 102  Jimmy Robertson
 107  Sam Baird
 106, 105  David Gilbert
 105  Martin Gould
 104, 104, 102  Jak Jones
 104  Sunny Akani
 104  Liang Wenbo
 104  Zhou Yuelong
 103, 100  Ian Burns
 103  Graeme Dott
 102  Anthony McGill
 102  Craig Steadman
 102  Zhang Jiankang
 101  Jordan Brown
 101  Noppon Saengkham
 101  Kyren Wilson
 100  Mark King

References

External links
 Official Website

2019
UK Championship
UK Championship
Sport in York
UK Championship
UK Championship
2010s in York